The 2020 Korean Series was the championship series of the 2020 KBO League season. The NC Dinos, as the regular season champions, automatically advanced to the Korean Series, where they faced the Doosan Bears, which advanced via the tenpin bowling-style stepladder final.

Because of KBO coverage during the pandemic, ESPN covered the Korean Series live in the United States.

Summary

See also

2020 Japan Series
2020 World Series

References

Korean Series
NC Dinos
Doosan Bears
Korean Series
Korean Series
Korean Series